The Waterfront Historic Area LeaguE, also known as WHALE, is a non-profit historic preservation organization located in New Bedford, Massachusetts.  Its mission is: "to promote the value and reuse of greater New Bedford's historic structures through preservation, education and advocacy". The organization often promotes its cause with the words of one of its founders, Sarah Delano (President of WHALE, 1966-1982).  Delano said, "if you bulldoze your heritage, you become just anywhere".

History 

The organization was founded by a group of concerned citizens in 1962, at a time when urban renewal threatened much of the city's history and architectural heritage.  The original focus was on the city's waterfront district, a dense area of whaling era buildings suffering from severe neglect and disrepair.  WHALE took on the preservation/restoration of as many as 20 buildings within the district's boundaries over the years.  This became the organization's first neighborhood revitalization project and lead to the establishment of Bedford Landing Waterfront National Register Historic District.  With WHALE's leadership, the district would later be designated, New Bedford Whaling National Historical Park.  Over time, WHALE expanded to properties beyond this district, taking on preservation projects throughout the city.  WHALE has now completed over 45 preservation and restoration projects in the greater New Bedford area between 1962 and 2009.

Significant projects 

1960's
Complete Inventory of National Landmark Historic District
Benjamin Rodman House
Reynolds Building

1970's
Abijah Hathaway House
Bedford Landing-Waterfront Historic District
Bourne Warehouse Trust
Caleb Spooner House
Eggers Building
Haile Luther House
Henry Beetle House
MacComber-Sylvia Building
McCullough Warehouse
Seth Russell House
Sundial Building
Rodman Candleworks
William Tallman Russell House
William Tallman Warehouse

1980's
Edward Coffin Jones Carriage House
Hatch Properties
Rotch-Jones-Duff House and Garden Museum
Schooner Ernestina
Zeiterion Theater

1990's
Benjamin Almy House
Connections Project
Corson Block
Custom House Square
Grinnell Congregate Home
Harborvisions Charrette
Nathan and Polly Johnson House
New Bedford Visitor Center
New Bedford Whaling National Historical Park
Paul Revere Sign
Re-Design of Route 18

Current activities 

Today, WHALE is run by an elected board of directors and hired staff.  WHALE staff positions consist of an Executive Director and an Office and Events Manager along with volunteers and occasional consultants.  WHALE works closely with other organizations in the area, including the City of New Bedford, New Bedford Historical Commission, the Massachusetts Historical Commission (MHC), the National Park Service and more.  Currently, WHALE is working on its Neighborhood Restoration Program, which focuses on the revitalization of the Washington Square Gateway Neighborhood, located in the New Bedford's south end.

References

External links 
 WHALE website

1962 establishments in Massachusetts
Architectural history
Historic preservation organizations in the United States
Non-profit organizations based in Massachusetts
New Bedford, Massachusetts
Organizations established in 1962